Flight Lieutenant Richard Hope Hillary (20 April 1919 – 8 January 1943) was an Anglo-Australian Royal Air Force fighter pilot during the Second World War. He wrote the book The Last Enemy about his experiences during the Battle of Britain.

Early life
Hillary was the son of an Australian government official and his wife (Michael and Edwyna Hillary) and was sent to England to be educated at Shrewsbury School and Trinity College, Oxford. He lived with his parents until the age of seven; from then until he was eighteen he saw them only during the summer holidays. Whilst at Oxford it has been claimed that he was secretary of the Oxford University Boat Club and president of the Rugby Club, but both claims are questionable. He rowed in the successful Trinity College VIII of 1938. He joined the Oxford University Air Squadron and the Royal Air Force Volunteer Reserve in 1939. Hillary was a descendant of Sir William Hillary, founder of the Royal National Lifeboat Institution.

Second World War
Hillary was called up to the Royal Air Force in October 1939 and in July 1940, having completed his training, he was posted to B Flight, No. 603 Squadron RAF, located at RAF Montrose, flying Spitfires.  The Squadron moved south to RAF Hornchurch on 27 August 1940 and immediately saw combat.  In one week of combat Hillary personally claimed five Bf 109s shot down, claimed two more probably destroyed and one damaged.

Hillary wrote about his first experience in a Supermarine Spitfire in The Last Enemy:

On 3 September 1940 he had just made his fifth "kill" when he was shot down by a Messerschmitt Bf 109 flown by Hauptmann Helmuth Bode of II./JG 26:

Unable to bail out of the flaming aircraft immediately, Hillary sustained extensive burns to his face and hands. Before it crashed he fell out of the stricken Spitfire unconscious. Regaining his senses whilst falling through space, he deployed a parachute and landed in the North Sea, where he was subsequently rescued by lifeboat Lord Southborough (ON 688) from the Margate Station.

Hillary was taken for medical treatment to the Royal Masonic Hospital, Hammersmith, London; and afterwards, under the direction of the surgeon Archibald McIndoe, to the Queen Victoria Hospital, East Grinstead, in Sussex. He endured three months of repeated surgery in an attempt to repair the damage to his hands and face, and went on to become one of the best known members of McIndoe's "Guinea Pig Club". He wrote an account of his experiences, published in 1942 under the title Falling Through Space in the United States, and as The Last Enemy in Great Britain.

In 1941, Hillary persuaded the British authorities to send him to America to rally support for Britain's war effort. While in the United States, he spoke on the radio, had a love affair with the actress Merle Oberon, and drafted much of The Last Enemy.

Hillary managed to bluff his way back into a flying position even though, as was noted in the officers' mess, he could barely handle a knife and fork. He returned to service with No 54 Operational Training Unit at RAF Charterhall after recovering from his injuries, for a conversion course to pilot night fighter aircraft.

Death
Hillary was killed in his 24th year on 8 January 1943, along with Navigator/Radio Operator Sgt. Wilfred Fison, when he crashed a Bristol Blenheim night fighter during a night training flight in adverse weather conditions, the aircraft coming down on farmland in Berwickshire, Scotland.

A funeral took place at St Martin-in-the-Fields, London, on 25 January 1943 at 12:30pm, followed by the cremation of his body at Golders Green Crematorium, where he is commemorated on the Commonwealth War Graves Commission memorial. His ashes were scattered from a Douglas Boston over the English Channel by his former 603 Squadron commanding officer, Wing Commander George Denholm.

Commemoration
In 2001 a memorial to Hillary was unveiled at the site of the former RAF Charterhall near Greenlaw, Berwickshire.

His love affair with Mary Booker, which lasted from December 1941 until his death, was the subject of Michael Burn's book Mary and Richard (1988).

He is today remembered in his alma mater of Trinity College, Oxford, by an annual literature prize, a portrait outside the college library, and an annual lecture in his honour (initiated in 1992). Lecturers have included Sebastian Faulks, Beryl Bainbridge (2000), Ian McEwan (2001), Julian Barnes (2002), Graham Swift (2003), Jeanette Winterson (2004), Mark Haddon (2005), Monica Ali (2006), Philip Pullman (2007), Howard Jacobson (2008), Colm Tóibín (2009), Carol Ann Duffy (2010), Tom Stoppard (2011), Andrew Motion (2012), Anne Enright (2013), Will Self (2014), Simon Armitage (2015) and David Hare (2016).

Works
 Richard H. Hillary, The Last Enemy  (1942), German Version: Der letzte Feind Zürich (1942), French version: "La dernière victoire" Londres (1944), Spanish Version: El último enemigo. Barcelona (2012)

References

Further reading
 Lovat Dickson, Richard Hillary (1950)
 Charles Higham and Roy Moseley, Princess Merle: The Romantic Life of Merle Oberon. . Pub: Coward-McCann, New York (1983)
 Michael Burn, Mary and Richard: the story of Richard Hillary and Mary Booker. . Pub: Deutsch, (1988)
 Sebastian Faulks, The Fatal Englishman: Three Short Lives: Christopher Wood, Richard Hillary, Jeremy Wolfenden.  (1996)
 David Ross, Richard Hillary: The Definitive Biography of a Battle of Britain Fighter Pilot and Author of The Last Enemy.  (2004)
 Arthur Koestler.  "The Birth of a Myth", Horizon, April 1943, republished in a longer version as "In Memory of Richard Hillary" in Yogi and Commissar, 46–67 (1945).

External links
 
 Richard Hillary Memorial 
 Richard Hillary notes from Battle of Britain site
 Richard Hillary portrait on the National Portrait Gallery, London site
 Spartacus Educational site with photo
 Hillary Memorial, Charterhall photographs

1919 births
1943 deaths
Alumni of Trinity College, Oxford
Australian World War II flying aces
Australian World War II pilots
Aviators killed in aviation accidents or incidents in Scotland
Royal Air Force personnel killed in World War II
Members of the Guinea Pig Club
People educated at Shrewsbury School
Royal Air Force officers
Royal Air Force pilots of World War II
The Few
Victims of aviation accidents or incidents in 1943
Writers from Sydney
Royal Air Force Volunteer Reserve personnel of World War II